Wynkoop Spring is an unincorporated community in Berkeley County, West Virginia, United States. Wynkoop Spring lies on the border with Jefferson County.

Unincorporated communities in Berkeley County, West Virginia
Unincorporated communities in West Virginia